Amy Poehler is an American actress, comedian, writer, and producer.

She gained acclaim and recognition on Saturday Night Live from 2001 to 2008, Leslie Knope in the NBC sitcom Parks and Recreation (2011-2015). She has also appeared in the television shows Arrested Development, Louie, 30 Rock, Broad City, Wet Hot American Summer: First Day of Camp and Wet Hot American Summer: Ten Years Later. Poehler is also known for her performances in film such as Wet Hot American Summer (2001), Mean Girls (2004), Blades of Glory (2007), Baby Mama (2008), and Sisters (2015). She is also known as the voice of Joy in the Disney-Pixar animated film Inside Out (2015).

Poehler has received 20 Primetime Emmy Award nominations for her work on Saturday Night Live, Parks and Recreation, The Golden Globe Awards, Russian Doll. She won her first Primetime Emmy Award in 2016 for her duo hosting gig for Outstanding Guest Actress in a Comedy Series for Saturday Night Live alongside Tina Fey. Poehler has also received two Daytime Emmy Award nominations, three Golden Globe Award nominations and three Screen Actors Guild Awards nominations. She also received a nomination for Grammy Award for Best Spoken Word Album for her book Yes Please.

Major associations

Primetime Emmy Awards

Daytime Emmy Awards

Golden Globe Awards

Grammy Awards

Screen Actors Guild Awards

Miscellaneous awards

References

Lists of awards received by American actor